The 1977 season was the Hawthorn Football Club's 53rd season in the Victorian Football League and 76th overall. Hawthorn entered the season as the defending VFL Premiers. Hawthorn qualified for finals for the fourth consecutive season.

Fixture

Premiership season

Finals Series

Ladder

References

Hawthorn Football Club seasons